Tredyffrin Township is a township located in eastern Chester County, Pennsylvania. The population was 29,332 at the 2010 census. 

Settled in the late 17th century, Tredyffrin is bounded by Delaware and Montgomery counties.   It includes on its northern boundary a small part of Valley Forge National Historical Park, where George Washington encamped during the American War of Independence.  Tredyffrin and the entire Great Valley region also have many limestone deposits. Tredyffrin is the most populous township in Chester County.

Unincorporated communities within Tredyffrin Township include Chesterbrook, Strafford, a portion of Paoli, and a portion of Wayne, Howellville (the intersection of Swedesford and Howellville Roads) and East Howellville (along Howellville Road, west of the intersection of Howellville Road and the border between Tredyffrin and Easttown Townships). Tredyffrin is bordered by Easttown, East Whiteland, Willistown, Charlestown, Upper Merion, Radnor and Schuylkill townships.

History 
On 13 March 1684, William Penn decided to set aside a portion of Pennsylvania for the Welsh to settle in.  This area, known as the "Welsh Tract", was surveyed in 1684 and included several modern-day townships, including Tredyffrin.  Although the Welsh Tract was originally meant to be a self-ruling municipality, it was divided between Chester County and Philadelphia when that county was created in 1685, and the Welsh subsequently submitted to the authority of Chester County.   In 1707, Tredyffrin was incorporated as a township.   This name comes from the Welsh tre(f), which means "town", joined to dyffryn, which means "wide, cultivated valley".   Tredyffrin was quick to develop into a thriving township.  In 1710, the first mill in Tredyffrin was started by Thomas Jerman on what is now North Valley Road.   Swedesford Road, one of the first roads in the township, was created by 1718.

As the population of the township grew, with 30 resident landowners in 1722 and 83 in 1774, churches sprung up to meet the demand by religious residents.  In 1710, the Baptist minister Hugh Davis moved to the Great Valley from Britain and, there being several Baptist families in this area, the Baptist Church in the Great Valley was formed on 22 April 1711.  The church originally met in Radnor.  However, there were enough members of this Baptist church that by 1722, a log building was erected in Tredyffrin to serve the congregation.

As Tredyffrin includes part of Valley Forge National Historical Park, there are many Revolutionary War-related sites in the township, especially the park and houses where various generals were quartered.

Development in the township was sparked in the 19th century by construction and advertisement of the "Main Line" railroad service, which terminated in Paoli, which straddles the western border of the township.

Tredyffrin-Easttown school district was unusual for the area in being racially integrated during the early part of the century. In 1932, the district planned to segregate after building a new school, and African Americans in the township boycotted the school system for two years in protest (the "School Fight"). In 1934 a negotiated settlement was reached whereby the schools remained integrated, and helped kill school segregation in Pennsylvania.

During the Cold War, a Nike anti-aircraft missile site was active in the township. It was located off Le Boutillier Road, near Swedesford Road.

Historic buildings 
County Bridge No. 171, Cramond, Cressbrook Farm, Federal Barn, Great Valley Mill, Greenwood Farm, David Havard House, Lafayette's Quarters, Maj. Gen. Lord Stirling Quarters, Mount Zion A.M.E. Church, Strafford Railroad Station, Valley Forge National Historical Park, Joseph Walker House, Van Leer Cabin, and Wetherby–Hampton–Snyder–Wilson–Erdman Log House are listed on the National Register of Historic Places. In addition, the Wharton Esherick Museum is listed as a National Historic Landmark; it was built starting in 1926.

Other notable buildings are:
 Diamond Rock Schoolhouse, an octagonal one-room school built in 1818.
 Seven colonial log houses and cabins.
 Knox Covered Bridge in Valley Forge National Historical Park.
 Revolutionary War sites: Quarters of Major General William Alexander, Lord Stirling; Quarters of Major General Marquis de Lafayette; Quarters of Brigadier General Anthony Wayne; Quarters of General Charles Cornwallis, and a number of other generals.
 Old Eagle School, built in 1788

Geography

Transportation

The Pennsylvania Turnpike (I-76) is the most prominent road serving Tredyffrin Township. It follows a southwest-northeast alignment across the northwestern portion of the township. U.S. Route 202 follows a similar alignment across the center of the township. U.S. Route 422 begins at US 202 in the northeastern corner of the township and follows the County Line Expressway northwestward. U.S. Route 30 follows Lancaster Avenue along an east-west alignment through the southern section of the township. Finally, Pennsylvania Route 252 follows Leopard Road, Bear Hill Road, Swedesford Road, Valley Forge Road and Valley Creek Road along a north-south alignment through the middle of the township.

Demographics

At the 2010 census, the township was 83.3% non-Hispanic White, 3.3% Black or African American, 0.1% Native American, 9.8% Asian, and 1.4% were two or more races. 2.2% of the population were of Hispanic or Latino ancestry.

As of the 2000 United States census, there were 29,062 people, 12,223 households, and 7,834 families residing in the township.  The population density was 1,464.9 people per square mile (565.6/km2).  There were 12,551 housing units at an average density of 632.6 per square mile (244.3/km2).  The racial makeup of the township was 90.88% White, 2.84% African American, 0.11% Native American, 5.12% Asian, 0.01% Pacific Islander, 0.29% from other races, and 0.74% from two or more races. Hispanic or Latino of any race were 1.20% of the population.

There were 12,223 households, out of which 29.0% had children under the age of 18 living with them, 55.9% were married couples living together, 6.2% had a female householder with no husband present, and 35.9% were non-families. 30.1% of all households were made up of individuals, and 9.1% had someone living alone who was 65 years of age or older.  The average household size was 2.36 and the average family size was 2.99.

In the township the population was spread out, with 23.3% under the age of 18, 4.7% from 18 to 24, 30.1% from 25 to 44, 27.2% from 45 to 64, and 14.7% who were 65 years of age or older.  The median age was 40 years. For every 100 females there were 89.9 males.  For every 100 females age 18 and over, there were 86.7 males.

The median income for a household in the township was $82,258, and the median income for a family was $105,183 (these figures had risen to $90,915 and $121,809 respectively as of a 2007 estimate). Males had a median income of $76,393 versus $46,124 for females. The per capita income for the township was $47,584.  About 2.2% of families and 3.7% of the population were below the poverty line, including 4.6% of those under age 18 and 2.8% of those age 65 or over.

Government
Tredyffrin is governed by a seven-member Board of Supervisors. Four members are elected from the township at-large, while three members are elected from specific districts, though all supervisors are treated equally once on the Board.

:

Politics
Party registration as of July 2010 were 45% Republican, 39% Democratic, and 16% Independent and third parties.  In the 2008 Presidential election, Tredyffrin voters gave 58% of its votes to Democratic candidate Barack Obama over John McCain, a significant change from previous elections. Mitt Romney vastly improved upon John McCain's performance, but still fell short as Barack Obama carried the township with 52% of the vote in the 2012 Presidential election.
Party registration as of December, 2019 stands at 43% Democratic, 39% Republican, 18% Independent and third parties.

Geology 
The rocks of Tredyffrin were laid down in the upper Paleozoic, meaning that they are primarily metamorphic. Limestone is often at the surface in the Great Valley, so many limestone kilns were created in the 18th century. Mine owner William Rennyson sold the fizzy water from his Howellville limestone quarry as "Tredyffrin Water" around 1900. The northern edge of the township is a ridge of quartzite and sandstone (the Cambrian Chickies Formation) including Valley Forge Mountain (or Mount Misery), which was mined for quartz in the 18th century through the mid-19th century.

Education

Primary and secondary schools 

Tredyffrin Township lies within the Tredyffrin/Easttown School District. Students residing within township boundaries attend Hillside Elementary School, New Eagle Elementary School, and Valley Forge Elementary School for grades K–4. Tredyffrin/Easttown Middle School and Valley Forge Middle School serve students in grades 5–8, and Conestoga High School serves students in grades 9–12.

Private schools in Tredyffrin Township include:
Delaware Valley Friends School (Paoli address)
Devon Preparatory School (grades 6–12, Devon address)
Woodlynde School (Strafford address)
Heritage School (preschool, Wayne address)
Vanguard School (ungraded special education, Paoli address)

Public libraries
Tredyffrin Township Libraries operates Tredyffrin Public Library and Paoli Library.

The architectural firm Mitchell/Giurgola developed the Tredyffrin Library. It has an amphitheater that is focused on a park in a southward direction. The library has a single large reading room. The library building has a larger two-story end, while the other end has only one story at the upper level. Offices at the main level are in a separate element of the structure from the main reading room, and this structure juts out from the flue. Architectural Record said that this "allows direct access to the reading room from the public entrance." In 1990 a new children's library was created on the lower level of the building in previously unfinished space.

As the community continued to grow and change, plans were finalized in 2004 to renovate and expand Tredyffrin Library. In September 2007, the library broke ground for a $6 million renovation and expansion. On January 31, 2009, the entire expanded building was open to the public for the first time.

Architectural Record stated that Tredyffrin Library and the library built in Condon Hall of the University of Washington School of Law, which was also designed by Mitchell/Giurgola, have common underlying concepts. According to the publication, the shared concepts were "unusual sensitivity in using natural light to best advantage while warding off the sun," a "quickly apparent organization of functions," and being "responsive to the varying situations in which it is built."

References

Sources
Futhey, J. Smith, and Gilbert Cope. History of Chester County, Pennsylvania, with Genealogical and Biographical Sketches. Philadelphia: Louis H. Everts, 1881.  
"Geologic Map of Pennsylvania". 2000. Commonwealth of Pennsylvania, Department of Conservation and Natural Resources, Bureau of Topographic and Geologic Survey. 16 December 2002.
"History of Tredyffrin Township". Tredyffrin Township, Chester County, PA. 16 December 2002.
"Limestone and Dolomite Distribution in Pennsylvania". 2000. Commonwealth of Pennsylvania, Department of Conservation and Natural Resources, Bureau of Topographic and Geologic Survey. 16 December 2002.
 "Relating common solutions: two libraries by Mitchell/Giurgola." Architectural Record. August 1977. Volume 162. p. 93-98. .

External links

 Tredyffrin Township official website
 Tredyffrin-Easttown School District
 Tredyffrin Historical Society

1707 establishments in Pennsylvania
Philadelphia Main Line
Populated places established in 1707
Townships in Chester County, Pennsylvania
Townships in Pennsylvania